Società Sportiva Lazio finished second in Serie A, and won the UEFA Cup Winners' Cup and Supercoppa Italiana.

Season review
Lazio kicked off the 1998–99 season by defeating Juventus 2–1 to win the Supercoppa in the pre-season, and then set a searing pace in the league thanks to the lethal striking partnership of world transfer record signing Christian Vieri and Marcelo Salas. The pair of them together netted 27 goals, as Lazio led the way for most of the season. Twenty-year-old Yugoslav starlet Dejan Stanković also impressed by scoring on his league debut.

Milan peaked late during the season, while Lazio had a barren spell, which enabled Milan to make up the deficit. Lazio finally squandered the title lead in the penultimate match of the season, where it had to settle for a draw against Fiorentina away from home.

Following the season, Vieri left the club for Inter, accusing chairman Sergio Cragnotti of lying to him. The money from Vieri's transfer was used to bring Juan Sebastián Verón, Simone Inzaghi and Diego Simeone to Rome, moves that all proved essential when Lazio clinched the title in 2000, where those three found the net in the last game of the season.

Lazio's best moment of the 1998-99 season came when they beat Mallorca 2-1 at Villa Park in Birmingham in the 1999 UEFA Cup Winners' Cup Final, following goals by Vieri and Pavel Nedvěd.

The most prolific players during the season was captain and centre-half Alessandro Nesta, free-kick specialist Siniša Mihajlović, winger Nedvěd, and the striker pairing of Vieri and Salas.

Players

Squad information
Squad at end of season

Transfers

Autumn

Winter

Left club during season

Competitions

Serie A

Results by round

League table

Matches

Coppa Italia

Second round

Round of 16

Quarter-finals

UEFA Cup Winners' Cup

First round

Second round

Quarter-finals

Semi-finals

Final

Supercoppa Italiana

Other matches and friendlies
Pre-season

Post-season

Statistics

Players statistics

Goalscorers
  Marcelo Salas 15 (2)
  Christian Vieri 12
  Roberto Mancini 10
  Siniša Mihajlović 8 (1)
  Sérgio Conceição 5

References

S.S. Lazio seasons
Lazio
UEFA Cup Winners' Cup-winning seasons